Haavisto is a village in the town of Karkkila, Finland. Village is located along regional road 133 (Mt 133) between Karkkila and Vihti. To the south there is a connecting road to Olkkala and Vihti's church village and to the north there is a road to Läyliäinen. Buses run through Haavisto a few times a day, mainly along regional road 132 (Mt 132), via Vihtijärvi and Klaukkala to Helsinki.

Villages in Finland